Alberto "Abet" Guidaben (born September 14, 1952) is a Filipino former professional basketball player in the PBA. He was part of the fabled Crispa Redmanizers ballclub that won two Grand Slams, in 1976 and 1983.

Collegiate and amateur career
Guidaben started his career with the Agoho (Mambajao, Camiguin) Pirates and the University of San Jose - Recoletos. Then in 1973, he became part of the Crispa team in the old Manila Industrial and Commercial Athletic Association (MICAA). The Crispa-Floro duo was again in the national team skippered by Jaworski for the 1974 Asian Games in Teheran.

Professional career
In the PBA, Guidaben was a "late-bloomer" with Crispa. During the league's early years, he played in the shadows of his more illustrious teammates like Philip Cezar, Atoy Co, and Bogs Adornado. But slowly, his talent as a big man emerged and became one of Crispa's greatest assets. He was already a good rebounder but later developed a strong inside game complemented with accurate off-the-glass jumpers from the perimeter. He was also one of the earliest dunkers in the PBA making the slam dunk vogue in the league a decade before the arrival of highflyers like Samboy Lim, Paul "Bong" Alvarez, Vergel Meneses and Nelson Asaytono. He also had a great rivalry with Toyota's Fernandez which was considered a classic in itself. He won MVP honors in 1983 while with Crispa and 1987 while with San Miguel Beer.

PBA career statistics

|-
| align="left" | 1975
| align="left" |Crispa
| 44 || 15.55 || .516 || .000 || .682 || 5.23 || 0.59 || 0.16 || 0.55 || 6.6
|-
| align="left" | 1976
| align="left" | Crispa
| 51 || 17.59 || .507 || .000 || .712 || 6.02 || 0.47 || 0.24 || 0.47 || 8.9
|-
| align="left" | 1977
| align="left" | Crispa
| 63 || 20.92 || .518 || .000 || .717 || 5.84 || 1.24 || 0.27 || 0.78 || 11.8
|-
| align="left" | 1978
| align="left" | Crispa
| 45 || 22.22 || .538 || .000 || .678 || 6.93 || 1.24 || 0.18 || 1.21 || 13.4
|-
| align="left" | 1979
| align="left" | Crispa
| 61 || 23.49 || .572 || .000 || .791 || 7.33 || 1.21 || 0.16 || 1.21 || 12.2
|-
| align="left" | 1980
| align="left" | Crispa
| 59 || 23.61 || .518 || .333 || .784 || 8.29 || 1.69 || 0.29 || 0.80 || 14.8
|-
| align="left" | 1981
| align="left" | Crispa
| 52 || 23.23 || .469 || .000 || .796 || 7.04 || 1.60 || 0.33 || 0.71 || 13.8
|-
| align="left" | 1982
| align="left" | Crispa
| 54 || 28.81 || .582 || .000 || .724 || 9.13 || 2.17 || 0.22 || 0.83 || 16.5
|-
| align="left" | 1983
| align="left" | Crispa
| 59 || 31.08 || .592 || .500 || .759 || 8.69 || 3.49 || 0.25 || 0.88 || 17.9
|-
| align="left" | 1984
| align="left" | Crispa
| 61 || 34.03 || .584 || .286 || .768 || 11.38 || 3.33 || 0.51 || 1.72 || 21.0
|-
| align="left" | 1985
| align="left" | Tanduay
| 50 || 39.40 || .552 || .263 || .742 || 11.18 || 4.46 || 0.50 || 1.44 || 22.8
|-
| align="left" | 1985
| align="left" | Manila Beer
| 17 || 28.29 || .523 || .000 || .843 || 6.35 || 2.12 || 0.82 || 0.71 || 14.3
|-
| align="left" | 1985
| align="left" | 2 Teams (Combined)
| 67 || 33.85 || .546 || ..227 || .759 || 9.96 || 3.87 || 0.58 || 1.25 || 20.66
|-
| align="left" | 1986
| align="left" | Manila Beer
| 38 || 35.53 || .493 || .364 || .767 || 9.84 || 2.68 || 0.55 || 0.87 || 15.1
|-
| align="left" | 1987
| align="left" | Magnolia/San Miguel
| 64 || 35.97 || .496 || .143 || .822 || 10.70 || 2.94 || 0.14 || 0.77 || 19.3
|-
| align="left" | 1988
| align="left" | San Miguel Beer
| 47 || 34.66 || .505 || .167 || .822 || 11.49 || 3.32 || 0.30 || 0.70 || 19.9 
|-
| align="left" | 1988
| align="left" | Purefoods
| 10 || 28.10 || .491 || .000 || .818 || 6.60 || 2.80 || 0.30 || 0.30 || 13.5
|-
| align="left" | 1988
| align="left" | 2 Teams (Combined)
| 57 || 31.38 || .504 || .143 || .746 || 10.63 || 3.23 || 0.30 || 0.63 || 18.81
|-
| align="left" | 1989
| align="left" | Alaska
| 29 || 29.38 || .499 || .400 || .876 || 9.76 || 2.28 || 0.34 || 1.00 || 16.4 
|-
| align="left" | 1990
| align="left" | Alaska
| 36 || 31.00 || .546 || .000 || .783 || 8.14 || 2.14 || 0.25 || 1.00 || 15.9 
|-
| align="left" | 1990
| align="left" | Pepsi
| 10 || 37.50 || .596 || .000 || .857 || 7.70 || 2.20 || 0.20 || 0.30 || 20.4 
|-
| align="left" | 1991
| align="left" | 2 Teams (Combined)
| 17 || 34.25 || .559 || .000 || .801 || 8.04 || 2.15 || 0.24 || 0.85 || 16.8
|-
| align="left" | 1991
| align="left" | Pepsi
| 43 || 32.49 || .513 || .000 || .798 || 7.95 || 2.44 || 0.34 || 1.19 || 16.8 
|-
| align="left" | 1992
| align="left" | 7-Up
| 55 || 34.55 || .514 || .333 || .802 || 7.78 || 3.40 || 0.64 || 0.95 || 16.9
|-
| align="left" | 1993
| align="left" | 7-Up
| 21 || 28.57 || .491 || .000 || .774 || 7.05 || 1.86 || 0.52 || 0.62 || 13.4 
|-
| align="left" | 1993
| align="left" | Shell Helix Ultra
| 9 || 16.89 || .525 || .000 || .875 || 4.56 || 1.11 || 0.22 || 0.55 || 5.4 
|-
| align="left" | 1994
| align="left" | Shell Rimula X
| 50 || 18.62 || .553 || .000 || .794 || 4.44 || 0.72 || 0.16 || 0.50 || 8.0
|-
| align="left" | 1995
| align="left" | Shell 
| 54 || 15.65 || .488 || .000 || .760 || 3.43 || 0.74 || 0.30 || 0.19 || 4.5
|-
| align="left" | Career
| align="left" |
| 1081 || 27.49 || .531 || .350 || .776 || 7.93 || 2.11 || 0.31 || 0.85 || 14.6

Retirement and later life
In 2000, he was named as one of the PBA's 25 greatest players of all-time in elaborate awards ceremonies that highlighted the 25th anniversary of the league.
After his retirement, he went into the construction business, and in 2003, he migrated to New Jersey in the United States with his family. Even in the U.S. he actively took part in benefit basketball events staged by the PBA Legends USA Foundation.

In 2007, he was enshrined into the PBA Hall of Fame along with Manny Paner, Danny Florencio, and Norman Black.

In 2010, he suffered from a serious ailment called Myasthenia Gravis and was admitted to the  Intensive Care Unit (ICU) for eight days. He managed to survive from the illness by taking steroids.

In 2012, he suffered two strokes in a span of one week, and was diagnosed with meningitis. He was again admitted to the  ICU as a result.

Personal life
Guidaben, with his wife, Maridol, has four children (Maria Elizabeth, JR, Michael and Katherine) and several grandchildren.

References

1952 births
Living people
Alaska Aces (PBA) players
Centers (basketball)
Crispa Redmanizers players
Basketball players at the 1974 Asian Games
Filipino emigrants to the United States
Magnolia Hotshots players
Manila Beer Brewmasters players
Philippine Basketball Association All-Stars
Philippines men's national basketball team players
Filipino men's basketball players
1974 FIBA World Championship players
Power forwards (basketball)
San Miguel Beermen players
Shell Turbo Chargers players
Sportspeople from Camiguin
Tanduay Rhum Masters players
TNT Tropang Giga players
USJ-R Jaguars basketball players
Asian Games competitors for the Philippines